SCPL may refer to:

Motorola SCPL, a prototype mobile phone
Staff Corporal (SCpl), a rank in the British Household Cavalry